Johnny Lee Hundley (October 19, 1914 – April 9, 1986) was an American Negro league outfielder in the 1940s.

A native of Moorhead, Mississippi, Hundley made his Negro leagues debut in 1943 with the Cleveland Buckeyes. In 30 recorded games for Cleveland that season, he posted 26 hits and 10 RBI in 109 plate appearances. Hundley served in the US Army during World War II, and after the war played briefly for the Chicago American Giants in 1946. He died in 1986 at age 71.

References

External links
 and Seamheads

1914 births
1986 deaths
Place of death missing
Chicago American Giants players
Cleveland Buckeyes players
Baseball outfielders
Baseball players from Mississippi
People from Moorhead, Mississippi
20th-century African-American sportspeople